William ‘Bill’ King was an Australian rugby league footballer in the New South Wales Rugby Football League's foundation season of 1908.

Playing career
A , King played for Eastern Suburbs club before joining the North Sydney club in 1912.

King was a member of the Eastern Suburbs side that played against South Sydney in rugby league's first premiership decider.

King is remembered as the Sydney Roosters 26th player.

References

External links
The Encyclopedia of Rugby League Players, by Alan Whiticker & Glen Hudson
History of the New South Wales Rugby League Finals, by Steve Haddan

Australian rugby league players
Sydney Roosters players
North Sydney Bears players
Rugby league fullbacks
New South Wales rugby league team players
Year of birth missing
Year of death missing
Place of birth missing